The men's 200 metre breaststroke was a swimming event held as part of the swimming at the 1924 Summer Olympics programme. It was the fourth appearance of the event, which was established in 1908. The competition was held on Tuesday July 15, 1924, on Wednesday July 16, 1924, and on Thursday July 17, 1924.

Records
These were the standing world and Olympic records (in minutes) prior to the 1924 Summer Olympics.

In the first heat Bob Skelton set a new Olympic record with 2:56.0 minutes.

Results

Heats

Tuesday July 15, 1924: The fastest two in each heat and the fastest third-placed from across the heats advanced.

Heat 1

Heat 2

Heat 3

Heat 4

Heat 5

Semifinals

Wednesday July 16, 1924: The fastest two in each semi-final and the faster of the two third-placed swimmer advanced to the final.

Semifinal 1

Semifinal 2

Final

Thursday July 17, 1924:

References

External links
Olympic Report
 

Swimming at the 1924 Summer Olympics
Men's events at the 1924 Summer Olympics